Sait Maden (3 May 1931 – 19 June 2013) was a Turkish translator, poet, painter and graphic designer.

He died on 19 June 2013 in Istanbul due to pneumonia after bypass surgery. His funeral was held at Şakirin Mosque and buried in Karacaahmet Cemetery on 21 June 2013.

References

External links
Selected works of Sait Maden, luc.devroye.org; accessed 6 March 2015.

1931 births
2013 deaths
Turkish translators
Turkish poets
Turkish painters
Turkish calligraphers
Turkish designers
Deaths from pneumonia in Turkey
Burials at Karacaahmet Cemetery
People from Çorum
Academy of Fine Arts in Istanbul alumni
20th-century poets
20th-century translators